Belyakovka is a rural locality (a selo) in Smelovsky Selsoviet of Oktyabrsky District, Amur Oblast, Russia. The population was 68 as of 2018. There is 1 street.

Geography 
Belyakovka is located 46 km northeast of Yekaterinoslavka (the district's administrative centre) by road. Yasnaya Polyana is the nearest rural locality.

References 

Rural localities in Oktyabrsky District, Amur Oblast